Loka Stadium is a multi-use stadium in Črnomelj, Slovenia. It is used mostly for football matches and was the home ground of NK Bela Krajina until their disbandment in 2016. The stadium holds 1,517 spectators. The stadium opened in 1955.

See also
List of football stadiums in Slovenia

Football venues in Slovenia
Multi-purpose stadiums in Slovenia
Sports venues completed in 1955
1955 establishments in Slovenia